Kallikrein-5, formerly known as stratum corneum tryptic enzyme (SCTE), is a serine protease expressed in the epidermis. In humans it is encoded by the KLK5 gene. This gene is one of the fifteen kallikrein subfamily members located in a cluster on chromosome 19. Its expression is up-regulated by estrogens and progestins. Alternative splicing results in multiple transcript variants encoding the same protein.

KLK5 has been suggested to regulate cell shedding (desquamation) in conjunction with KLK7 and KLK14, given its ability to degrade proteins which form the extracellular component of cell junctions in the stratum corneum. It is proposed that KLK5 regulates this process since it is able to self-activate in addition to activating KLK7 and KLK14.

References

Further reading

External links
 The MEROPS online database for peptidases and their inhibitors: S01.017